Girls Academy (GA) is a soccer league and development platform for female soccer players in the United States. Formed in 2020, the league features youth academies and youth clubs from various organizations, including National Women's Soccer League.

History 
Citing the financial impact of the coronavirus pandemic, the U.S. Soccer Federation announced it was ending the U.S. Soccer Development Academy, leaving top boys and girls clubs to look for a new home. Former Development Academy clubs had a few options, choosing to move to either the already established Elite Clubs National League (ECNL), or the Girls Academy, founded by a group of leaders from the Development Player League (DPL).

Former University of Washington women's soccer coach Lesle Gallimore serves as commissioner of the Girls Academy. She accepted the position in the summer of 2020, after the conclusion of her 26-year tenure as head coach of the women's soccer team at the University of Washington.

In October 2020, Girls Academy announced a strategic relationship with Major League Soccer and a partnership with USYS. According to the press release, Girls Academy will work in coordination with MLS Next, to “deliver a true pyramid for female youth players in the US, with the GA serving as the USYS premier girls platform in conjunction with MLS.” The partnership will focus on establishing academy standards for coaching and player development, improving talent identification partnerships, enhancing coaching education, and creating competitions to showcase players. While GA will maintain full autonomy over its league, they will also benefit from advice from the leaders of MLS and USYS as it aims to become the premier league for elite female soccer players in the United States.

Competition format 
Girls Academy features age groups starting at U-13 through U-19. During the regular season, teams play other members from their respective conferences. The league includes eight conferences (Northwest, Southwest, Frontier, Mid-America, Northeast, Mid-Atlantic, Mountain West, and Southeast). Top teams from each conference will participate in Playoffs, and National Finals for qualifying teams based on playoff performance. Non-playoff teams will also participate in a season-ending showcase.

Different age groups will also have a varying number of national events throughout the year to provide additional talent showcase opportunities in front of college and professional scouts.

National champions

Notable players 
Since its founding in 2020, the league has had players join the ranks of U.S. Women's Youth National Teams.

U20 Youth National Team 

 Mia Justus (2022, IMG Academy)
 Neeku Purcell (2022, OL Reign Academy)
 Ayo Oke (2022, Tophat)
 Lilly Reale (2022, South Shore Select)
 Evelyn Shores (2022, Tophat)
 Emily Colton (2022, City SC)
 Carina Lageyre (2022, Florida United)
 Michelle Cooper (2022, IMG Academy)
 Andrea Kitahata (2022, Bay Area Surf)

U17 Youth National Team 

 Nicollette Kiorpes (2022, NEFC)
 Keegan Schmeiser (2022, Chicago FC United)
 Amalia Villarreal (2022, Michigan Jaguars)

U15 Youth National Team 

 Molly Vapensky (2022, Chicago FC United)
 Jocelyn Travers (2022, Bay Area Surf)
 Kimmi Ascanio (2022, Florida United)
 Atehortua Montes (2022, New York Soccer Club)
 Kennedy Zorn (2022, SC del Sol)
 Ashlyn Puerta (2022, Albion SC)

References 

Women's soccer in the United States
Youth soccer in the United States
Soccer leagues in the United States